Hazem Mabrouk Awaad (born 22 November 1973) is an Egyptian handball player. He competed in the men's tournament at the 2000 Summer Olympics.

His brothers, Ashraf, Hussein, Belal, Ibrahim and Hassan, are also international handball players.

References

External link

1973 births
Living people
Egyptian male handball players
Olympic handball players of Egypt
Handball players at the 2000 Summer Olympics
Place of birth missing (living people)